This is a list of the National Register of Historic Places listings in Waupaca County, Wisconsin. It is intended to provide a comprehensive listing of entries in the National Register of Historic Places that are located in Waupaca County, Wisconsin.  The locations of National Register properties for which the latitude and longitude coordinates are included below may be seen in a map.

There are 25 properties and districts listed on the National Register in the county.

Current listings

 the 1915 Tudor Revival Peter Hansen house, the 1921 Christofferson Hospital, the 1921 Spanish Colonial Mortenson house, and the 1926 Colonial Revival Godfrey house,

|}

See also

List of National Historic Landmarks in Wisconsin
National Register of Historic Places listings in Wisconsin
Listings in neighboring counties: Marathon, Outagamie, Portage, Shawano, Waushara, Winnebago

References

Waupaca